ÓBerytus (also stylized as O'Berytus or O Berytus) is a football academy based in Jnah, a district of Beirut, Lebanon. Founded in 2016, their women's football club compete in the Lebanese Women's Football League. They also compete in youth divisions, with the U18 Women's team having competed in the Gothia Cup.

History
Formed in 2016, ÓBerytus debuted in the 2017–18 season, finishing in third place. The following season, they came third once again.

See also
 Lebanese Women's Football League
 Women's football in Lebanon
 List of women's association football clubs in Lebanon

References

 
Women's football clubs in Lebanon
2016 establishments in Lebanon
Association football clubs established in 2016